The Great Escape is a reality television series on TNT that premiered on June 24, 2012, at 10:00 pm EDT. The competition series, hosted by Rich Eisen, features three two-person teams each week who are dropped "into the middle of their own epic action/adventure movie" and competing for a cash prize. The show is produced by Imagine Television directors Ron Howard and Brian Grazer, and The Amazing Race producers, Bertram van Munster and Elise Doganieri. The series finished airing on August 26, 2012 and was cancelled in October 2012.

Development
TNT ordered a pilot episode of The Great Escape from Imagine Entertainment in November 2010, with both Ron Howard and Brian Grazer serving as executive producers, and was considered an initial foray into the reality television market for the network. Bertram van Munster and Elise Doganieri, the creators of The Amazing Race, were added as executive producers in mid-2011, prior to casting and filming of the pilot. Subsequently, in January 2012, TNT announced that it has greenlit ten episodes (only airing nine of them) of The Great Escape, stating that the program has "all the heart-pounding excitement and nail-biting suspense of a summer popcorn movie".

The show was produced as to create an experience for the players and the audience of being inside a movie; Howard noted that the elements of clues and puzzle-solving bring to mind his earlier films, The Da Vinci Code and Apollo 13. After selecting a site, the route is carefully crafted as to keep contestants from going too far off the target course, particularly in dangerous environment such as a bayou. Production arrives about a week before filming to prepare the area and create any necessary props for the challenge or the course; in the case of the bayou, homemade shacks were constructed for the starting point for the teams. Challenges are tested to make sure that they are doable within reasonable time prior to filming. Contestant are given as much freedom as necessary to complete the game, with production stepping in only to stop players from certain actions.

Format
Each episode is a single competition among three teams of two contestants with a previous relationship, such as family relations, lifelong friends, or married or dating couples. Teams are identified by the color of shirts they wear.

The teams are escorted while blindfolded to an undisclosed location, which varies with each episode. They are locked in cells with the game's "Detainment Zone" that include a concealed map and the means to release themselves from their cell (such as with a key or with a set of bolt-cutters). When the game starts, teams must find the map, free themselves, and follow the instructions on the map to the first of four stages. Each stage includes a physical or mental challenge the teams must complete that gives them directions to the next stage, a part of a larger "Escape Key", and other miscellaneous tools such as flashlights, which are used as part of the next Stage or for their transport. Teams must complete these tasks on their own, typically each given their own identical station, puzzle, or set of equipment to work with. When traversing between stages or working on challenges, teams must avoid detection by "guards" and/or spotlights. If they are spotted, the guard yells out, "(Red/Blue/Green) team, stop!", and the captured players are forced to drop all current implements (other than the map) to be re-escorted to the Detainment Zone, where they then must again find the means to escape from detainment. Once free, they can proceed to the point they were captured and recover their equipment, but again must avoid detection by the guards. An announcer broadcasts to all teams when a team has escaped from their cell, completed the next stage, quit the game, or has been captured by guards, allowing other teams to judge their progress. The announcer also broadcasts when the competition is over and which team won.  The other two teams are not shown completing the other tasks.

After completing four stages, the teams will need to assemble the Great Escape Key to identify their final destination and reach a "Transport Zone" to be taken to this place.  The first team to successfully arrive at this destination (where the host is) with the completed Escape Key is awarded the $100,000 prize.

Episodes

Reception
The Great Escape has been likened to The Amazing Race and, in at least one case, considered a "lite" version of the latter show. Mary McNamara of the Los Angeles Times felt that though there was little chance to get to know the individual teams as one would on The Amazing Race, the shorter format avoids the post-show celebrity pitfalls; McNamara noted that "The contestants are playing a game, not transforming themselves as human beings". Rodney Ho, writing for the Atlanta Journal-Constitution, felt each episode was like a mini-movie with "ultra-cool" venues and "thumping, dramatic music", but the challenges offered in the opening episodes were "less interesting" and "not nearly as outrageous" as challenges on other reality shows. Rob Owen of the Pittsburgh Post-Gazette felt the show was "overly produced", such as the means by which the guards are to detect the teams, and that with teams rotating in each week, it was "pretty much impossible to invest in characters who are essentially guest stars".

The first episode had received approximately 1.6 million viewers, but lost nearly half of those by the season finale, facing competition from other shows on Sunday night in the summer block; in comparison, TNT's dramas such as The Closer and Major Crimes had viewerships in excess of 7 million through the summer and were the highest watched shows for the network. TNT announced in October 2012 that it has not opted for a second season of the show, though will continue to test out other unscripted shows for their network.

References

General references

External links
 
 

2010s American reality television series
2012 American television series debuts
2012 American television series endings
2010s American game shows
English-language television shows
Television series by 20th Century Fox Television
TNT (American TV network) original programming
Television game shows with incorrect disambiguation
Television series by Imagine Entertainment
Television shows filmed in Arizona
Television shows filmed in California
Television shows filmed in Louisiana